"Straight Back Down" is a song by Australian singer and songwriter Dean Lewis. The song was released to commercial hit radio in August 2019 as the fourth single from Lewis' debut studio album, A Place We Knew. It was the most added song to radio the following week.

Reception
In an album review, Cameron Adams from Herald Sun said "'Straight Back Down' adopts the familiar Vance Joy stance and Lewis gets to showcase his upper register." Island Records said "The climactic chorus of 'Straight Back Down' is tailor made for festivals."

Release history

References

 
2019 singles
Dean Lewis songs
Universal Music Australia singles
2019 songs
Songs written by Dean Lewis
Songs written by Nick Atkinson
Songs written by Edd Holloway